William Robinson Bishop (December 27, 1864 or 1869 – December 15, 1932) was a professional baseball player. He was a pitcher over parts of three seasons (1886–1887, 1889) with the Pittsburgh Alleghenys and Chicago White Stockings. For his career, he compiled an 0–4 record in seven appearances, with a 9.96 earned run average and nine strikeouts.

There is disagreement about the year of Bishop's birth. Retrosheet and Baseball-Reference list his year of birth as 1864, whereas Fangraphs lists his birth year as 1869. If Fangraphs is correct, Bishop was one of the youngest players in Major League Baseball history, making his debut at roughly 16 years, nine months old.

See also
 List of Major League Baseball annual saves leaders

External links

1869 births
1932 deaths
Major League Baseball pitchers
Baseball players from Pennsylvania
Pittsburgh Alleghenys players
Chicago White Stockings players
Milwaukee Cream Citys players
Lowell Magicians players
London Tecumsehs (baseball) players
Syracuse Stars (minor league baseball) players
Buffalo Bisons (minor league) players
Utica Braves players
Mansfield (minor league baseball) players
Olean (minor league baseball) players
19th-century baseball players
People from Westmoreland County, Pennsylvania
Burials at Homewood Cemetery